SOCR is an acronym that can refer to:
Statistics Online Computational Resource
Seattle Office for Civil Rights
State Operated Community Residence
Stand-alone optical character reader
Special Operational Capability Report
Special Operations Craft – Riverine (SOC-R)